Augusto Codecá (7 June 1906 – 7 May 1978) was an Argentine film actor.

Selected filmography
 Palermo (1937)
 Cándida (1939)
 Candida, Woman of the Year (1943)
 The Three Musketeers (1946)

References

Bibliography 
 Finkielman, Jorge. The Film Industry in Argentina: An Illustrated Cultural History. McFarland, 24 Dec 2003.

External links 
 

1906 births
1978 deaths
Argentine male film actors
People from Buenos Aires